Crocus graveolens is a species of flowering plant in the family Iridaceae. It is native to Lebanon, Palestine, Syria, and Turkey.

Found growing around 1000 meters in stony fields, scrub, and pine forests; flowering occurs in February and March.

The flowers are yellow with finely divided stigma with around 12 threads; plants produce many narrow leaves that are grey-green. The tunic of the corms are parallel fibred, and the flowers smell like elder.

References

graveolens
Plants described in 1882
Taxa named by George François Reuter
Taxa named by Pierre Edmond Boissier
Flora of Lebanon
Flora of Palestine (region)
Flora of Syria